Alles Wat Mal Is is the third studio album from South African electronic rock group Die Heuwels Fantasties, released in 2012 by Supra Familias in South Africa.

Track listing

References

Die Heuwels Fantasties albums
2012 albums